The 1934 United States Senate election in Tennessee was held on November 5, 1934. Incumbent Democratic Senator Kenneth D. McKellar was re-elected to a fourth term in office, defeating Republican former Governor Ben W. Hooper.

Democratic primary

Candidates
Kenneth McKellar, incumbent Senator since 1917
John Randolph Neal Jr., attorney, academic, and perennial candidate

Results

General election

Candidates
Ben W. Hooper, former Governor of Tennessee (1911–15) (Republican)
Kenneth McKellar, incumbent Senator since 1917 (Democratic)
C. W. Hoisington (Independent)

Results

See also
1934 United States Senate elections

References

1934
Tennessee
United States Senate